Consumer Protection Act may refer to:

United States
 Agriculture and Consumer Protection Act of 1973
 Anticybersquatting Consumer Protection Act, 1999
 Bankruptcy Abuse Prevention and Consumer Protection Act, 2005
 Consumer Credit Protection Act, 1968
 Dodd–Frank Wall Street Reform and Consumer Protection Act, 2010
 Internet Gambling Regulation, Consumer Protection, and Enforcement Act, 2009
 Telephone Consumer Protection Act of 1991

Other
 Consumer Protection Act 1987, United Kingdom
 Consumer Protection Act (Quebec), Canada
 Consumer Protection Act, 1986, India
 Consumer Protection Act, 2019, India

Consumer protection law
Consumer_protection_legislation